Rey Iván Popoca (born February 26, 1982) is a Mexican former professional boxer.

Amateur career
A construction worker by day, Popoca still managed to run his amateur record to an outstanding 137-13.

Professional career
Popoca put on an impressive performance against a very slick Mike Gonzalez (10-6-1, 9 KOs), knocking him out in the sixth round. He suffered his first defeat on April 15, 2011 against Ruslan Provodnikov. He suffered his second defeat on July 13, 2012 against Jose Louis Castillo via eighth-round TKO.

References

External links

Boxers from Guerrero
Light-welterweight boxers
Boxers from Chicago
1982 births
Living people
American male boxers